Unión Ájax is a Honduran soccer club based in Trujillo, Honduras.

The club has played in the Honduran second division as recently as in 2011.

Former managers
  Donaldo Cáceres (2008)

References

Football clubs in Honduras